The Oreca 07 is a Le Mans Prototype built by French manufacturer Oreca to meet the 2017 FIA and ACO LMP2 regulations. It made its official race debut in the opening round of the 2017 IMSA WeatherTech SportsCar Championship, the 24 Hours of Daytona, and its FIA World Endurance Championship debut at the 2017 6 Hours of Silverstone. The car is the successor to the Oreca 05.

Oreca 07 turned out to be the car of choice for LMP2 teams, finding more buyers every year, who switched to the chassis from the previously purchased ones of other brands. 26 out of 27 LMP2 cars on the grid of the 2022 24 Hours of Le Mans represented the Oreca brand.

Development

The preparation of the prototype trace back to the development of the Oreca 05. The Oreca 05 was developed with the consideration of what the factory knew about the new technical rules for the LMP2 class in the FIA World Endurance Championship for 2017. Taking knowledge from the Oreca 05's performance, the French team decided to develop a new car, and based it around the predecessor. Oreca's goal was to maximize the performance by focusing on the energy and resource usage. The team opted to use this strategy not only to build a car based on a proven predecessor, but also to allow teams update their Oreca 05's within reason to costs. The chassis of the Oreca 07 is mainly based on the 05, with the monocoque being not focused on much with the car. The Oreca 07 internals come equipped with a Gibson GK-428 V8 engine.

The car performed its first factory shakedown test in late October 2016 at Circuit Paul Ricard.

Current orders see confirmed production until the end of April 2022, at which point well over 90 chassis will have been produced, including 8 chassis for the Acura ARX-05 DPI programme and 9 updates for the Oreca 05, but not including the Rebellion R-One (based on the 05) or Rebellion R13 (based on the 07) – (or indeed the grandfathered Alpine A480). The total does include the re-named but identical Alpine LMP2s and Aurus 01s. The following month, chassis #100 (though technically the 99th due to skipping #13) was delivered to Cool Racing for the 2022 24 Hours of Le Mans, and will eventually be displayed at the company's factory showroom.

Alpine A470

French car manufacturer Alpine raced the Alpine A470 in the FIA World Endurance Championship with Team Signatech Alpine Matmut. This car is technically identical to the Oreca 07, using the same chassis and internals, with Alpine branding.  This is the successor to the Alpine A460, which Alpine raced and won the LMP2 category for the 2016 FIA World Endurance Championship season.

Acura ARX-05

A variation of the prototype, the Acura ARX-05, was created for IMSA's WeatherTech SportsCar Championship Prototype class under the DPi regulations. The car was developed in partnership with Honda Performance Development and Oreca. The powerplant of the vehicle is a production-based 3.5 litre V6 twin-turbo Acura AR35TT. Other alterations from the 07 include Acura-specific bodywork.

From 2018 to 2020, Team Penske entered a pair of ARX-05s, winning the title in the latter two seasons. For 2021 and 2022, Wayne Taylor Racing and Meyer Shank Racing campaigned one of the ARX-05s previously run by Penske.

Aurus 01
G-Drive Racing competed with Oreca 07 in 2017 and 2018. Russian car manufacturer Aurus Motors partnered with them in 2019 to rebrand it as Aurus 01 and to race it  in the European Le Mans Series.  This car is technically identical to the Oreca 07, using the same chassis and internals, with Aurus branding.

Rebellion R13

The Rebellion R13 is a sports prototype racing car built by French constructor Oreca on behalf of Swiss-based team Rebellion Racing. It is a variation of the Oreca 07, created to compete in the LMP1 class. It would later be renamed by Alpine to Alpine A480 when it was rebadged to run in grandfathered condition in the Hypercar class in 2021 and 2022.

External links

References

24 Hours of Le Mans race cars
Le Mans Prototypes
Sports prototypes